Meindl is a German surname. Notable people with the surname include:

Anthony Meindl (born 1968), American actor
Eugen Meindl (1892–1951), German general
James D. Meindl (born 1933), American electrical engineer
Leonardo Meindl (born 1993), Brazilian basketball player

German-language surnames